"Juke Box Jive", by English band The Rubettes, was the lead single from their second album We Can Do It.  As with their two previous singles, it was written by the songwriting team of Wayne Bickerton and Tony Waddington and produced by Bickerton. The single reached number 3 in the UK charts.

"Juke Box Jive" was one of the four demonstration recordings recorded by session musicians and singers in October 1973 which led to the formation of the Rubettes - the others being "Sugar Baby Love", "Tonight" and "Sugar 
Candy Kisses" (which became a hit for Mac and Katie Kissoon).

The UK single featured non-album-track "When You're Falling in Love" as the b-side, while other markets featured "Forever" (from the band's debut album Wear It's 'At) as the b-side.

Charts

Weekly charts

Year-end charts

Later Uses
 Cover versions project Top of the Pops featured a version of "Juke Box Jive" on Top of the Pops, Volume 42 released in December 1974.

References

1975 singles
The Rubettes songs
Songs written by Wayne Bickerton
1975 songs
Songs written by Tony Waddington (songwriter)